Harpal Brar (born 5 October 1939) is an Indian communist politician, writer and businessman, based in the United Kingdom. He is the founder and former chairman of the Communist Party of Great Britain (Marxist–Leninist), a role from which he stood down in 2018.

Born in Muktsar, Punjab, British India, Brar has lived and worked in Britain since 1962, first as a student, then as a lecturer in law at Harrow College of Higher Education (later merged into the renamed University of Westminster), and later in the textile business. Brar owns buildings in West London which he uses for CPGB-ML party activity, and he part-owns an internet shop called "Madeleine Trehearne and Harpal Brar" which sells shawls.

Brar is the editor of a left-wing political newspaper Lalkar, the former journal of the Indian Workers' Association. Brar has written multiple books on subjects such as communism, Indian republicanism, imperialism, anti-Zionism, anti-colonialism, and the British General Strike. He is also a co-founder of the Hands off China Campaign.

Political activities

Brar joined the Maoist Revolutionary Marxist-Leninist League but soon left to become a founder member of a small group, the Association of Communist Workers, as well as being a member of the Association of Indian Communists.

He and his comrades officially dissolved the ACW in 1997 to join Arthur Scargill's Socialist Labour Party, a breakaway from the Labour Party after its abandonment of the original version of Clause IV. Brar was the parliamentary candidate in Ealing Southall in 2001, coming eighth with 921 votes. Brar and his comrades worked to bring what they described as an Anti-Revisionist Marxist-Leninist programme to the SLP, but were eventually expelled seven years later.

Scargill expelled the entire Yorkshire Regional Committee and five members of the National Executive Committee. From this, in July 2004, the Communist Party of Great Britain (Marxist-Leninist) was formed, and Brar was its chairman.

Adopting positions maintained by Brar and his comrades since the 1960s, the CPGB-ML has been vigorously opposed to all those who work with or in any way endorse the Labour Party since its inception. Its stated aim on formation was to oppose opportunism in the working-class movement, revive the "class against class" programme embodied by the Communist Party of Great Britain during the 1920s, and to work for the establishment of socialism in Britain.

The Communist Party of Great Britain (Marxist–Leninist) was registered with the Electoral Commission in 2008 under the name Proletarian, which is the title of the bi-monthly newspaper of the CPBG-ML. The party was registered "to prepare for standing in elections".

At the eighth congress of the CPGB-ML in September 2018, Brar announced that he would step down as chairman of the party, to be replaced by Ella Rule.

Views on China
On 19 July 2008, Harpal Brar was one of the people who founded the Hands off China campaign, dedicated to defending the People's Republic of China and to defending "China's sovereignty and territorial integrity" and "the country's just stance on issues of its vital national interest such as Taiwan and Tibet."

Views on India
Brar heavily disagrees with the popular belief that the fight for Indian independence was a peaceful and pacifist movement, led entirely by Mahatma Gandhi and the Indian National Congress. He wrote a book on Indian history called Inquilab Zindabad: India's Liberation Struggle, in which he argues that the fight was a violent and bloody class struggle involving the masses, and accuses Gandhi and Congress (described as "the most compromising, cowardly and obscurantist representatives of the India bourgeoisie") of supporting British imperialism.

Views on the Soviet Union
Brar defends the governments and leaders of the USSR until the appearance of Khrushchevite revisionism during the 20th Congress of the Communist Party of the Soviet Union in 1956. Lalkar, the newspaper edited by Brar, criticises The British Road to Socialism (the programme of the original Communist Party of Great Britain) from its earliest version in 1951 as "un-Marxist" and regards the claim that Joseph Stalin approved it as a "fiction". Brar is seen as an admirer of Stalin and has been attacked as an "anachronism" in the Weekly Worker publication of the Communist Party of Great Britain (Provisional Central Committee), which Brar in turn regards as Trotskyite propaganda.

He has chaired and is an active member of the Stalin Society, along with his daughter Joti Brar (deputy leader of the Workers Party of Britain). The Society denies Soviet wrongdoing in the Katyn massacre which they blame on the Nazis, the Soviet famine of 1932–33 which they blame on foreign sanctions, kulak sabotage and weather patterns, and the Moscow Trials which they describe as fair process.

Publications
For many years, he was on the executive of the Indian Workers Association (GB) and was the editor of that organisation's journal Lalkar. He continues to publish the journal, but the IWA cut its ties with the paper in 1992, when members of the executive committee with affiliations to the Communist Party of India (Marxist) objected to Brar's publishing of an article that was mildly critical of the adoption of market socialism in China.

Since 1992, Brar has self-published fourteen books on various aspects of Marxism, imperialism and revisionism. These works are a combination of original material and articles previously published in Lalkar and have been translated and distributed internationally by a number of sympathetic communist parties around the world.

Works
Inquilab Zindabad, India's Liberation Struggle (2014)
Revisionism and the Demise of the USSR
The 1926 British General Strike
Nato's Predatory War Against Yugoslavia
Imperialism and War
Imperialism – the Eve of the Social Revolution of the Proletariat
Chimurenga! The Liberation Struggle in Zimbabwe
Imperialism – Decadent, Parasitic, Moribund Capitalism
Bourgeois Nationalism or Proletarian Internationalism?
Perestroika: The Complete Collapse of Revisionism (1992)
Trotskyism or Leninism? (1993)
Social Democracy: The Enemy Within (1995)

Elections contested
UK Parliament elections

European Parliament elections

London Assembly elections (Entire London city)

Notes

External links

Preface to Brar's book Trotskyism or Leninism?.
Brar's business website.

1939 births
Academics of the University of Westminster
Stalinism
Anti-revisionists
British communists
Living people
Leaders of political parties in the United Kingdom
People from Sri Muktsar Sahib
Socialist Labour Party (UK) members
Maoists
British social commentators
Indian businesspeople in textiles
Indian expatriates in the United Kingdom
British political party founders
Indian political party founders
British political candidates